Aechmea smithiorum is a plant species in the genus Aechmea. It is a medium-sized bromeliad with broad green leaves and a striking white rosette.

Aechmea smithiorum is  a rare bromeliad that grows as an epiphyte and sometime terrestrially.  It is indigenous to seasonal forest and lower montane rainforests of the Lesser Antilles: Montserrat, Guadeloupe, Dominica, Martinique, St. Lucia, St. Vincent, Grenada.

Varieties
Two varieties are recognized:

Aechmea smithiorum var. longistipitata E.Gross - St. Vincent
Aechmea smithiorum var. smithiorum - Lesser Antilles

Cultivars
 Aechmea 'Amethyst'

References

smithiorum
Flora of the Caribbean
Plants described in 1896
Flora without expected TNC conservation status